Peter George Lynn (January 28, 1906 – December 3, 1967) was an American actor and writer.

Early life
Lynn was born January 28, 1906, in Cumberland, Maryland. He graduated from Washington and Lee University and worked as a pilot for Curtiss-Wright before he became an actor.

Career
Lynn acted in about 30 plays at the Pasadena Playhouse. He appeared in films such as Sinner Take All (1936), the MGM Academy Award nominated short Torture Money (1937), The Great Dictator (1940), and To Be or Not to Be (1942). Towards the end of his career he appeared in television series such as The Adventures of Rin Tin Tin (1956–8), The Untouchables (1959) and The Deputy (1961).

Lynn was also a playwright and a contributor of material published in magazines.

Death
Lynn died December 3, 1967, in Los Angeles, California.

Selected filmography

Film

 Tough Guy (1936) - Patrolman (uncredited)
 Sinner Take All (1936) - Stephen
 Torture Money (1937, Short) - Larry Martin
 Internes Can't Take Money (1937) - Joe (uncredited)
 The Duke Comes Back (1937) - Al
 Charlie Chan at Monte Carlo (1937) - Al Rogers
 City Girl (1938) - Steve (uncredited)
 Island in the Sky (1938) - Charlie - Butler's Henchman (uncredited)
 Too Hot to Handle (1938) - Harry Harding (uncredited)
 Time Out for Murder (1938) - Henchman Blackie
 Cipher Bureau (1938) - Lt. Tydall
 Newsboys' Home (1938) - Balke (uncredited)
 Risky Business (1939) - Jackson's Henchman (uncredited)
 Pardon Our Nerve (1939) - Bodyguard (uncredited)
 Society Smugglers (1939) - Austin
 Mystery Plane (1939) - 'Brandy' Rand
 Let Us Live (1939) - Joe Taylor
 Wolf Call (1939) - Father Devlin
 Mr. Wong in Chinatown (1939) - Captain Guy Jackson
 Quick Millions (1939) - H. Jenkins 'Hank' Pierson
 The Housekeeper's Daughter (1939) - Gangster (uncredited)
 Buried Alive (1939) - Gus Barth
 The Man Who Wouldn't Talk (1940) - Convict (uncredited)
 The Lone Wolf Strikes (1940) - Dorgan
 Northwest Passage (1940) - Joe Turner (uncredited)
 Kit Carson (1940) - James King
 Drums of the Desert (1940) - Capt. Jean Bridaux
 The Great Dictator (1940) - Commander of Storm Troopers
 The Saint in Palm Springs (1941) - Jimmy (uncredited)
 The Penalty (1941) - George, Police Operative (uncredited)
 Adventures of Captain Marvel (1941, Serial) - Prof. Dwight Fisher [Ch. 1-6]
 Saddlemates (1941) - LeRoque aka Wanechee
 Caught in the Draft (1941) - Pilot (uncredited)
 Criminals Within (1941) - Prof. Carroll (uncredited)
 Bombay Clipper (1942) - Bland
 Plan for Destruction (1942) - Rudolf Hess
 To Be or Not to Be (1942) - Actor-Adjutant
 Grand Central Murder (1942) - Paul Rinehart
 A-Haunting We Will Go (1942) - Darby Mason
 The Secret Code (1942, Serial) - Chief Stover [Ch.1]
 Commandos Strike at Dawn (1942) - German Radio Announcer (uncredited)
 G-Men vs. the Black Dragon (1943, Serial) - Pilot Thug (uncredited)
 Tarzan Triumphs (1943) - Nazi Pilot (uncredited)
 Tonight We Raid Calais (1943) - German Lieutenant
 Slightly Dangerous (1943) - 'Times' Reporter (uncredited)
 They Came to Blow Up America (1943) - Herman - Gestapo Driver (uncredited)
 Dr. Gillespie's Criminal Case (1943) - Mack (uncredited)
 Hitler's Madman (1943) - 1st Officer (uncredited)
 Appointment in Berlin (1943) - Under Officer (uncredited)
 The North Star (1943) - German Pilot (uncredited)
 Northern Pursuit (1943) - Johnson - Mountie (uncredited)
 The Crime Doctor's Strangest Case (1943) - Walter Burns (uncredited)
 The Impostor (1944) - Soldier (uncredited)
 None Shall Escape (1944) - Otto - S.S. Officer (uncredited)
 The Fighting Sullivans (1944) - Officer (uncredited)
 Two-Man Submarine (1944) - Norman Fosmer
 The Hitler Gang (1944) - SS Man (uncredited)
 The Story of Dr. Wassell (1944) - Lt. Smith (uncredited)
 Wilson (1944) - Reporter (uncredited)
 The House of Frankenstein (1944) - Inspector Gerlach
 She Gets Her Man (1945) - Sinister Cameraman (uncredited)
 High Powered (1945) - Joe Jackson (uncredited)
 Sudan (1945) - Bata
 The Master Key (1945, Serial) - Herman - Chief Thug
 Counter-Attack (1945) - Russian Lieutenant (uncredited)
 Secret Agent X-9 (1945, Serial) - Bach
 Shady Lady (1945) - Card Player (uncredited)
 Girl on the Spot (1946) - Tony Bracken (uncredited)
 Tangier (1946) - Lieutenant
 Lost City of the Jungle (1946, Serial) - Henchman Marlow
 Her Kind of Man (1946) - Houseman (uncredited)
 Notorious (1946) - Photographer (uncredited)
 Under Nevada Skies (1946) - Henchman LeBlanc
 Monsieur Beaucaire (1946) - Soldier (uncredited)
 Suddenly, It's Spring (1944) - Reporter (uncredited)
 Killer at Large (1947) - Rand
 The Naked City (1948) - Det. Fredericks (uncredited)
 Best Man Wins (1948) - Mr. Crow
 For the Love of Mary (1948) - (uncredited)
 The Snake Pit (1948) - Doctor (uncredited)
 Homicide for Three (1948) - Bill Daggett - aka Ludwig Rose
 Criss Cross (1949) - Andy (uncredited)
 The Beautiful Blonde from Bashful Bend (1949) - Townsman (uncredited)
 Take One False Step (1949) - Policeman (uncredited)
 D.O.A. (1949) - Homicide Detective (uncredited)
 Gun Crazy (1950) - Holdup Victim (uncredited)
 Side Street (1950) - Frank (uncredited)
 The Asphalt Jungle (1950) - Detective at Ciavelli's Apartment (uncredited)
 Union Station (1950) - Detective Moreno (uncredited)
 Three Secrets (1950) - Reporter (uncredited)
 Insurance Investigator (1951) - Jerry Hatcher (uncredited)
 Apache Drums (1951) - Bartender (uncredited)
 Show Boat (1951) - Blackjack Dealer (uncredited)
 The Day the Earth Stood Still (1951) - Colonel Ryder (uncredited)
 The Desert Fox: The Story of Rommel (1951) - German Lieutenant (uncredited)
 Fixed Bayonets! (1951) - Colonel - 26th Infantry (uncredited)
 My Favorite Spy (1951) - Official (uncredited)
 The Bushwackers (1952) - Guthrie
 Finders Keepers (1952) - Allen (uncredited)
 Something to Live For (1952) - Kennedy Brother, Executive (uncredited)
 The Atomic City (1952) - Robert Kalnick
 My Man and I (1952) - Bit Role (uncredited)
 Bonzo Goes to College (1952) - Bartender (uncredited)
 The Congregation (1952)
 The Lawless Breed (1953) - Duncan - Texas Ranger (uncredited)
 Raiders of the Seven Seas (1953) - Spanish Officer (uncredited)
 Powder River (1953) - Deputy (uncredited)
 The Great Adventures of Captain Kidd (1953) - London Official (uncredited)
 Ride Clear of Diablo (1954) - Deputy (uncredited)
 Magnificent Obsession (1954) - Williams - Bob's Butler (uncredited)
 Sign of the Pagan (1954) - Servant (uncredited)
 World in My Corner (1956) - Mallinson's Butler (uncredited)
 The Werewolf (1956) - Dr. Morgan Chambers
 The Boss (1956) - Tom Masterson
 Gun Brothers (1956) - Blake, Gang Member (uncredited)
 The Halliday Brand (1957) - Townsman #3
 Mister Cory (1957) - Headwaiter (uncredited)
 The Man Who Turned to Stone (1957) - Dr. Freneau
 The Deadly Mantis (1957) - Bus Driver (uncredited)
 Beau James (1957) - Reporter (uncredited)
 La donna che venne dal mare (1957) - Dario Nucci
 I Was a Teenage Frankenstein (1957) - Sgt. Burns
 Sing, Boy, Sing (1958) - Mr. Starrett (uncredited)
 Girl in the Woods (1958) - Operator
 Voice in the Mirror (1958) - Alcoholic (uncredited)
 Career (1959) - Stage Manager (uncredited)

Television
The Lone Ranger (1950) - Squire Turnbull
The Adventures of Rin Tin Tin (1956–1958) - Clint Desay / Red
The Untouchables (1959) - Doctor / Hood
The Deputy (1961) - Willis

References

External links

 

1906 births
1964 deaths
American male film actors
American male television actors
Actors from Cumberland, Maryland
20th-century American male actors
American male stage actors
Washington and Lee University alumni